Torreón is one of the municipalities of Coahuila de Zaragoza, a state in north-eastern Mexico. The city of Torreón is the municipal seat for Torreón Municipality. The municipality covers an area of 1947.7 km².

As of 2010, the municipality had a total population of 639,629.

References

Municipalities of Coahuila
Torreón